Benton Charter Township is a charter township of Berrien County in the U.S. state of Michigan.  As of the 2020 census, the population was 14,374.

Communities
Benton Heights is an unincorporated community and census-designated place in the west-center of the township, adjacent to Benton Harbor.
Fair Plain is an unincorporated community and census-designated place in the southwest part of the township, extending west into St. Joseph Charter Township.
Millburg is an unincorporated community and, a census-designated place in the township at  near the boundary with Bainbridge Township in Berrien County. It is situated several miles east of Benton Harbor and just east of the intersection of I-94 and I-196/US 31. It was the site of the first settlement within the township. Jehiel Enos settled there in 1834.

History
The township was established on March 11, 1837, and was named after Thomas Hart Benton, U.S. senator from Missouri. It remained attached to St. Joseph Township for administrative purposes until 1841.

The commune of the House of David was located in the township.

In 1967, the Benton Harbor Fruit Market, established in 1860 in Benton Harbor, moved to the township. The Benton Harbor city limits have since then extended to include the market.

Geography 

The township is in the northwest portion of the county, with Lake Michigan to the west in the north of the township and Benton Harbor to the west in the south of the township. St. Joseph and St. Joseph Charter Township lie to the southwest. Hagar Township is to the north, Coloma Charter Township to the northeast, Bainbridge Township is to the east, Pipestone Township is to the southeast, and Sodus Township and Royalton Township are to the south.

I-94 traverses the township diagonally from northeast to southwest. The southern terminus of I-196 is at the junction with I-94. US 31 follows parts of I-196, I-94, Napier Avenue, and all of the completed portion of the St. Joseph Valley Parkway within the township. M-139 lies in the southwest of the township and runs from I-94 to a junction with Business Loop I-94 just east of Benton Harbor (the southbound direction begins on the Benton Harbor–Benton Township border).

Demographics

2000 Census
At the 2000 census, there were 16,404 people, 6,485 households and 4,221 families residing in the township. The racial makeup of the township was 44.11% White, 51.86% African American, 0.37% Native American, 0.36% Asian, 0.01% Pacific Islander, 1.48% from other races, and 1.82% from two or more races. Hispanic or Latino of any race were 3.14% of the population.

There were 6,485 households, of which 32.6% had children under the age of 18 living with them, 35.9% were married couples living together, 24.3% had a female householder with no husband present, and 34.9% were non-families. 29.6% of all households were made up of individuals, and 11.4% had someone living alone who was 65 years of age or older. The average household size was 2.49 and the average family size was 3.05.

Age distribution was 30.0% under the age of 18, 8.9% from 18 to 24, 26.8% from 25 to 44, 20.8% from 45 to 64, and 13.4% who were 65 years of age or older. The median age was 33 years. For every 100 females, there were 88.9 males. For every 100 females age 18 and over, there were 81.8 males.

The median household income was $25,942, and the median family income was $30,899. Males had a median income of $31,563 versus $20,484 for females. The per capita income for the township was $14,137. About 22.5% of families and 27.7% of the population were below the poverty line, including 42.3% of those under age 18 and 16.6% of those age 65 or over.

Economy
Whirlpool Corporation has its headquarters in the township. Whirlpool employs a total of 2,058 employees in the metropolitan area.

Education
Benton Charter Township is served by the Benton Harbor Public Library located within the Benton Harbor city limits.

Sports and recreation
Point O'Woods Golf & Country Club is located in the township, just northwest of Millburg.

Sarett Nature Center, a  wildlife sanctuary which offers trails, an interpretative building, and classes, is located in the northern portion of the township. It is named for Lew R. Sarett, father of Lewis Hastings Sarett.

References

External links

 Benton Charter Township official website
 Benton Harbor Fruit Market
 Sarett Nature Center

Townships in Berrien County, Michigan
Charter townships in Michigan